The Hinterer Seelenkogel is a mountain in the Gurgler Kamm group of the Ötztal Alps.

See also
 List of mountains of the Alps

External links
 "Hinterer Seelenkogel / Cima delle Anime" on Summitpost

Mountains of Tyrol (state)
Mountains of South Tyrol
Mountains of the Alps
Alpine three-thousanders
Ötztal Alps